Come Dance with Me may refer to:

Come Dance with Me (1950 film), British film directed by Mario Zampi
Come Dance with Me (1959 film), French-Italian film starring Brigitte Bardot
"Come Dance with Me" (song), 1959 song by Jimmy Van Heusen
Come Dance with Me! (album), 1959 Frank Sinatra album
"Come Dance with Me", episode of British children's TV series Rainbow; see List of Rainbow (TV series) episodes#Series 10 (1980–1981)
"Come Dance with Me" (Norwegian song), Norway's 2007 entry in Eurovision Song Contest
Come Dance with Me (TV series), an American dance competition series

See also
Dance with Me (disambiguation)